The 1998–99 OHL season was the 19th season of the Ontario Hockey League. The Brampton Battalion and the Mississauga IceDogs were added as expansion teams. The league realigned from three divisions into two conferences and four divisions. Brampton were placed in the Midwest division of the Western conference, and Mississauga were placed in the Central division of the Eastern conference. The OHL inaugurated four new trophies this season. The Holody Trophy was created for the regular season champion of the Midwest division. Two conference playoffs champions were created; the Bobby Orr Trophy for the Eastern conference, and the Wayne Gretzky Trophy for the Western conference. The fourth new trophy was the Wayne Gretzky 99 Award, to be awarded to the MVP of the playoffs. Twenty teams each played sixty-eight games. The Belleville Bulls won the J. Ross Robertson Cup, defeating the London Knights.

Expansion

Brampton Battalion
On December 3, 1996, the Brampton Battalion was granted an expansion franchise owned by Scott Abbott. The team began play in the 1998–99 season, playing in the Midwest Division of the Western Conference. The Battalion's arena was the newly constructed Brampton Centre.

Brampton played in their first game on September 24, 1998, losing 5–1 to the Peterborough Petes on the road. Their first home game was on October 9, as the Battalion dropped a 5-1 decision to the Kitchener Rangers in front of a sold-out crowd of 4,800 at the Brampton Centre. After beginning the season with six losses, Brampton won their first game, defeating the Sudbury Wolves 5–4 on October 18.

Mississauga IceDogs
On January 21, 1997, the Mississauga IceDogs was granted an expansion franchise which included former Boston Bruins head coach Don Cherry in their ownership group. The IceDogs began play in the 1998–99 season, playing in the Central Division of the Eastern Conference. The IceDogs arena was the newly constructed Hershey Centre.

The IceDogs played in their first game on September 25, 1998, losing a road game to the Kingston Frontenacs by a score of 10–0. Mississauga began the season with an 11-game road trip, as the club lost each game. In their home opener on October 30, Mississauga recorded their first win in franchise history, defeating the Toronto St. Michael's Majors 4–3 in front of a sold out of 6,000 fans at the Hershey Centre.

Realignment
With the Brampton Battalion and Mississauga IceDogs joining the Ontario Hockey League for the 1998–99 season, the league underwent a massive realignment in which two new conferences, the Eastern Conference and Western Conference, were created. Within each conference was two five-team divisions. The playoff format changed that the top eight teams in each conference made the post-season.

Eastern Conference

East Division
The East Division consisted of five teams that played in the division during the 1997-98 season. The teams were the Belleville Bulls, Kingston Frontenacs, Oshawa Generals, Ottawa 67's, and Peterborough Petes. The Toronto St. Michael's Majors left the division, joining the Central Division.

Central Division
The Central Division underwent some major changes following the 1997-98 division. The Barrie Colts, North Bay Centennials and Sudbury Wolves remained in the division, however, the Guelph Storm, Kitchener Rangers, and Owen Sound Platers all left the division, joining the newly formed Midwest Division in the Western Conference. Joining the Central were the Toronto St. Michael's Majors from the East Division, and the expansion Mississauga IceDogs.

Western Conference

Midwest Division
The Midwest Division was a newly created division in the Western Conference. Joining the division were the Guelph Storm, Kitchener Rangers and Owen Sound Platers from the Central Division, while the Erie Otters joined from the West Division. The expansion Brampton Battalion also joined the division.

West Division
The West Division consisted of five teams that played in the division during the 1997-98 season. The teams were the London Knights, Plymouth Whalers, Sarnia Sting, Sault Ste. Marie Greyhounds and Windsor Spitfires. The Erie Otters left the division, joining the newly formed Midwest Division.

New Arena

Sarnia Sports & Entertainment Centre
The Sarnia Sting moved from the Sarnia Arena to their new home, the Sarnia Sports & Entertainment Centre. The Sting defeated the Kitchener Rangers 5–2 in their first game at their new home on September 25, 1998, in front of a sold-out crowd of 4,635 fans.

Regular season

Final standings
Note: DIV = Division; GP = Games played; W = Wins; L = Losses; T = Ties; OTL = Overtime losses; GF = Goals for; GA = Goals against; PTS = Points; x = clinched playoff berth; y = clinched division title; z = clinched conference title

Eastern conference

Western conference

Scoring leaders
Note: GP = Games played; G = Goals; A = Assists; Pts = Points; PIM = Penalty minutes

Leading goaltenders
Note: GP = Games played; Mins = Minutes played; W = Wins; L = Losses: OTL = Overtime losses;  SL = Shootout losses; GA = Goals Allowed; SO = Shutouts; GAA = Goals against average

Playoffs

Conference quarterfinals

Eastern conference quarterfinals

(1) Barrie Colts vs. (8) Kingston Frontenacs

(2) Ottawa 67's vs. (7) North Bay Centennials

(3) Belleville Bulls vs. (6) Sudbury Wolves

(4) Oshawa Generals vs. (5) Peterborough Petes

Western conference quarterfinals

(1) Plymouth Whalers vs. (8) Windsor Spitfires

(2) Guelph Storm vs. (7) Erie Otters

(3) Owen Sound Platers vs. (6) Sault Ste. Marie Greyhounds

(4) Sarnia Sting vs. (5) London Knights

Conference semifinals

Eastern conference semifinals

(1) Barrie Colts vs. (4) Oshawa Generals

(2) Ottawa 67's vs. (3) Belleville Bulls

Western conference semifinals

(1) Plymouth Whalers vs. (5) London Knights

(2) Guelph Storm vs. (3) Owen Sound Platers

Conference finals

Eastern conference finals

(3) Belleville Bulls vs. (4) Oshawa Generals

Western conference finals

(3) Owen Sound Platers vs. (5) London Knights

OHL finals

J. Ross Robertson cup finals

(E3) Belleville Bulls vs. (W5) London Knights

J. Ross Robertson Cup Champions Roster

Playoff scoring leaders
Note: GP = Games played; G = Goals; A = Assists; Pts = Points; PIM = Penalty minutes

Playoff leading goaltenders

Note: GP = Games played; Mins = Minutes played; W = Wins; L = Losses: OTL = Overtime losses; SL = Shootout losses; GA = Goals Allowed; SO = Shutouts; GAA = Goals against average

All-Star teams

First team
Daniel Tkaczuk, Centre, Barrie Colts
Ryan Ready, Left Wing, Belleville Bulls
Ivan Novoseltsev, Right Wing, Sarnia Sting
Brian Campbell, Defence, Ottawa 67's
Bryan Allen, Defence, Oshawa Generals
Brian Finley, Goaltender, Barrie Colts
Peter DeBoer, Coach, Plymouth Whalers

Second team
Harold Druken, Centre, Plymouth Whalers
Denis Shvidki, Left Wing, Barrie Colts
Norm Milley, Right Wing, Sudbury Wolves
Kevin Mitchell, Defence, Guelph Storm
Martin Skoula, Defence, Barrie Colts
Tyrone Garner, Goaltender, Oshawa Generals
Lou Crawford, Coach, Belleville Bulls

Third team
Peter Sarno, Centre, Sarnia Sting
Jay Legault, Left Wing, London Knights
Sheldon Keefe, Right Wing, Barrie Colts
Nick Boynton, Defence, Ottawa 67's
Nikos Tselios, Defence, Plymouth Whalers
Seamus Kotyk, Goaltender, Ottawa 67's
Dave Siciliano, Coach, Owen Sound Platers

Awards

1999 OHL Priority Selection
On June 5, 1999, the OHL conducted the 1999 Ontario Hockey League Priority Selection at the Brampton Centre for Sports & Entertainment in Brampton, Ontario. The Mississauga IceDogs held the first overall pick in the draft, and selected Jason Spezza from the Brampton Battalion. Spezza was awarded the Jack Ferguson Award, awarded to the top pick in the draft.

Below are the players who were selected in the first round of the 1999 Ontario Hockey League Priority Selection.

See also
List of OHA Junior A standings
List of OHL seasons
1999 Memorial Cup
1999 NHL Entry Draft
1998 in sports
1999 in sports

References

HockeyDB

Ontario Hockey League seasons
OHL